Madness of Love (Spanish: Amor de locura) is a 1953 Mexican comedy film directed by Rafael Baledón and starring Niní Marshall, Óscar Pulido and Yolanda Montes.

Cast
 Niní Marshall as Juana / Juana La Loca / Catalina  
 Óscar Pulido as Don Felipe Hermosillo  
 Yolanda Montes as Aldara  
 Antonio Aguilar as Álvaro  
 Pedro de Aguillón as Don Filiberto  
 Rafael Banquells as Representante  
 Lupe Carriles as Elvira  
 Alfonso Iglesias Padre as Don Fidencio  
 Hermanos Reyes
 Luz María Aguilar as Chica en la corte de la reina  
 Daniel Arroyo as Cliente en cabaret  
 Stephen Berne as Hombre en fiesta de palacio  
 Manuel Casanueva as Pintor  
 Cecilia Leger as Clienta en cabaret  
 Concepción Martínez as Clienta en restaurante  
 Luis Manuel Pelayo as Mesero en cabaret  
 Carlos Robles Gil as Cliente en cabaret  
 Félix Samper as Cliente en cabaret  
 Manuel 'Loco' Valdés as Bailarín  
 Hernán Vera as Portero  
 Acela Vidaurri as Chica vende cigarillos

References

Bibliography 
 María Luisa Amador. Cartelera cinematográfica, 1950-1959. UNAM, 1985.

External links 
 

1953 films
1953 comedy films
Mexican comedy films
1950s Spanish-language films
Films directed by Rafael Baledón
Mexican black-and-white films
1950s Mexican films